The Grow 2 is a 2015 Chinese animated adventure comedy film directed by Ha Lei. It was released in China on May 29, 2015. The film was preceded by The Grow (2012).

Voice cast
Yu Li
Wu Tian Hao
Rong Rong
Zhang Yuan

Reception
By June 2, 2015, the film had earned  at the Chinese box office.

References

2010s adventure comedy films
2015 animated films
2015 films
Animated adventure films
Animated comedy films
Chinese animated films
2015 comedy films